Island is a home rule-class city in McLean County, Kentucky, in the United States. The population was 458 at the 2010 census. It is included in the Owensboro metropolitan area.

History
The city is named for Judge William Worthington's early 19th-century 8-square mile estate, known as The Island from the way high tide on the Green and other nearby rivers would maroon it from adjacent land. Between 1829 and 1860, the local post office operated as Worthington. The Owensboro and Nashville Railroad connected the area in 1872; the station and new post office were known as Island Station. Both were shortened to Island in 1882.

Geography
Island is located at  (37.442444, -87.146633). It is located in the southeastern portion of McLean County along U.S. Route 431 at its junction with Kentucky Route 85. Also traversing the city is Kentucky Route 2110. 

Demographics

As of the census of 2000, there were 435 people, 182 households, and 123 families residing in the city. The racial makeup of the city was 99.31% White, 0.23% Native American, 0.46% from other races.

There were 182 households, out of which 34.6% had children under the age of 18 living with them, 54.9% were married couples living together, 10.4% had a female householder with no husband present, and 32.4% were non-families. 29.1% of all households were made up of individuals, and 13.7% had someone living alone who was 65 years of age or older. The average household size was 2.39 and the average family size was 2.98.

In the city, the population was spread out, with 26.9% under the age of 18, 8.7% from 18 to 24, 26.2% from 25 to 44, 25.3% from 45 to 64, and 12.9% who were 65 years of age or older. The median age was 36 years. For every 100 females, there were 90.8 males. For every 100 females age 18 and over, there were 83.8 males.

The median income for a household in the city was $23,750, and the median income for a family was $31,875. Males had a median income of $33,333 versus $15,313 for females. The per capita income for the city was $15,284. About 9.5% of families and 12.5% of the population were below the poverty line, including 16.0% of those under age 18 and 21.3% of those age 65 or over.

Notable people
 Bobby Veach, former MLB player
 William Worthington - founder, Revolutionary War Veteran, Kentucky State Senator, Circuit Court Judge
 Colonel Absalom Redmond Shacklett - Highest-ranking officer of Civil War within McLean County, American-Mexican War veteran, POW, State Legislator

References

Cities in Kentucky
Cities in McLean County, Kentucky
Owensboro metropolitan area
Coal towns in Kentucky